The 1905 Army Cadets football team represented the United States Military Academy in the 1905 college football season. In their second and final season under head coach Robert Boyers, the Cadets compiled a  record, shut out three opponents, and outscored all opponents by a combined total 

Army's losses were to Virginia Tech, Harvard, Yale, and the Carlisle Indians. In the annual Army–Navy Game, the Cadets and Midshipmen tied at six.  Halfback Henry Torney was honored as a consensus first-team player on the All-America team.

Schedule

References

Army
Army Black Knights football seasons
Army Cadets football